Kisilyakh-Tas is a mountain in Yakutia, Far Eastern Federal District, Russia. Administratively it belongs to the Lower Kolyma District.

This mountain is one of the renowned places of Yakutia where kigilyakhs are found. Kigilyakhs are rock formations that are held in high esteem by Yakuts. Kisilyakh means "Mountain having a man" or "Mountain married" in the Yakut language.

Geography

Kisilyakh-Tas is located in a flat area, where there are only two other mountains nearby, a higher one to the SW and a smaller one to the west, both on the other side of the river. The three mountains are roughly at the same distance from each other.

The mountain is difficult to reach in the summer, but could be reached in April on a snowmobile if the weather is fine.

See also
Kigilyakh
List of mountains in Russia

References

External links
A. A. Konstantinovsky & N. Lipchanskaya, Structure and sedimentary formations of the northern Yana-Kolyma Fold System, Yakutia

Mountains of the Sakha Republic